Edwards may refer to:

People
 Edwards (surname)
 Edwards family, a prominent family from Chile
 Edwards Barham (1937-2014), a former member of the Louisiana State Senate
 Edwards Pierrepont (1817–1892), an American attorney, jurist, and orator

Places
Edwards County (disambiguation) (multiple)
Edwards Islet (Ducie Island), in the Pitcairn Islands
Edwards, Osgoode Township, Ontario, Canada

Australia
Edwards Beach, site of one Sydney artists' camps, New South Wales
Edwards Islet (Tasmania)

United States
Edwards, Arkansas, in Prairie County
Edwards, California
Edwards, Colorado
Edwards, Illinois
Edwards, Kentucky, in Logan County (see April 2, 2006 tornado outbreak)
Edwards Dam, a former dam on the Kennebec River in Maine
Edwards, Michigan
Edwards, Mississippi
Edwards, Missouri
Edwards (town), New York 
Edwards (village), New York
Edwards, Wisconsin
Edwards Air Force Base, in California
Edwards Plateau region of Texas
Edwards Aquifer, an aquifer in that region
Edwards County, Illinois
Edwards County, Kansas
Edwards County, Texas
Edwards Township, Michigan
Edwards Township, Minnesota

Corporations and products
Edwards (company), a fire protection and signaling systems corporation
A. G. Edwards, a full-service US securities broker-dealer
Edwards Lifesciences, a manufacturer of cardiovascular disease treatment equipment
Edwards Ltd, vacuum engineering business of Atlas Copco
Edwards Theaters, a movie theatre chain owned by Regal Entertainment Group
ESP Edwards Series, an electric guitar brand produced by the ESP company in Japan
Edwards, a brand name of frozen pies owned by the Schwan Food Company
Edwards Super Food Store, a former supermarket chain in the United States
Edwards Personal Preference Schedule, a non-projective personality inventory
JD Edwards, a computer software company

Ships
USS Edwards, the name of various United States Navy ships

Court cases 
 Edwards v. Aguillard, a 1987 U.S. Supreme Court ruling on teaching Creationism in Louisiana
 Edwards v. Arizona, a 1981 U.S. Supreme Court ruling on police interrogation and the fifth amendment
 Edwards v. California, a 1941 U.S. Supreme Court ruling on interstate migration
 Edwards v. Habib, a 1968 D.C. Circuit (United States) decision on retaliatory eviction
 Edwards v. Habib, a 1953 U.S. Supreme Court ruling on demonstrations at a state house
 Indiana v. Edwards, a 2008 U.S. Supreme Court ruling on competency to stand trial
 Edwards v. Canada (Attorney General), also known as the Persons Case, a 1930 case in the Judicial Committee of the Imperial Privy Council on women's eligibility to be members of the Canadian federal Senate
 Edwards v National Coal Board, a 1949 English Court of Appeal ruling on the meaning of "reasonably practicable"
 Grant v Edwards, a 1986 English Court of Appeal case on common intention

Other uses
Edwards River (disambiguation)
Edwards syndrome, a genetic disorder

See also
Edward (disambiguation)
Edwardsville (disambiguation)
Justice Edwards (disambiguation)